Chandrapur is a village in Katwa I CD block in Katwa subdivision of Purba Bardhaman district in the state of West Bengal, India.

Geography

Location

Urbanisation
88.44% of the population of Katwa subdivision live in the rural areas. Only 11.56% of the population live in the urban areas. The map alongside presents some of the notable locations in the subdivision. All places marked in the map are linked in the larger full screen map.

Demographics
As per the 2011 Census of India Chandrapur had a total population of 2,104, of which 1,030 (49%) were males and 1,074 (51%) were females. Population below 6 years was 251. The total number of literates in Chandrapur was 1,124 (60.66% of the population over 6 years).

Transport
Chandrapur is on State Highway 15 running from Dainhat (in Purba Bardhaman district) to Gadiara (in Howrah district). Chandrapur bus stand is at the junction point of SH 15 and Chandrapur-Balgona Road (also known as Dainhat Road) and the village is just off SH 15.

Education
Chandrapur College was established at Chandrapur in 1985. It is affiliated with the University of Burdwan and offers honours courses in Bengali, Sanskrit, English, history, geography, political science, philosophy, and mass communication and journalism. It has a girls’ hostel.

Healthcare
There is a primary health centre at Chandrapur (with 10 beds).

References

Villages in Purba Bardhaman district